Anthelidae is a family of Australian lappet moths in the order Lepidoptera. It had earlier been considered to be part of the Lasiocampoidea superfamily, but a 2008 molecular phylogenetic study, supported by a 2011 study, resulted in reincluding the Anthelidae in the superfamily Bombycoidea.

Diversity
The subfamily Anthelinae consists of a total of nine genera and ninety-four species.
Of these, seven genera and about ninety-one species, while the subfamily Munychryiinae comprises two genera and three species:
Subfamily Anthelinae:
Anthela
Chelepteryx
Chenuala
Corticomis
Nataxa
Omphaliodes
Pterolocera
Subfamily Munychryiinae:
Munychryia
Gephyroneura

References

External links
Anthelidae
Anthelidae
Anthelidae

 
Moth families